MarShawn Davon Thamir Lloyd (born January 5, 2001) is an American football running back who most recently played for the South Carolina Gamecocks.

High school career
Lloyd lived in Delaware, but traveled everyday to attend DeMatha Catholic High School in Hyattsville, Maryland. He was selected to play in the 2020 Under Armour All-American Game. A five-star recruit, Lloyd committed to the University of South Carolina to play college football.

College career
Lloyd missed his first year at South Carolina in 2020 due to a torn ACL. He returned from the injury to play in 12 games as a backup in 2021 and rushed 64 times for 228 yards and one touchdown. Lloyd took over as the starter his redshirt sophomore year in 2022.

References

External links
South Carolina Gamecocks bio

2001 births
Living people
Players of American football from Delaware
American football running backs
South Carolina Gamecocks football players